Savigno is a frazione of the comune (municipality) of Valsamoggia in the Province of Bologna in the Italian region Emilia-Romagna, located about  southwest of Bologna.  It was an independent commune until 2014.

References 

Cities and towns in Emilia-Romagna